Jordan Bonel, sometimes also de Confolens (fl. late 12th century), was a troubadour from western Aquitaine about whom very little is definitively known except that he was associated with the court of Alfonso II of Aragon. His vida states that he was from Saintonge and he appears to have been contemporary with Bertran de Born. His surviving corpus probably consists of three cansos, wherein only one is attributed to him, though its melody survives: 

The melody has similar to those of Arnaut de Maruelh, but is rather conservative when compared with his more illustrious contemporaries. It is in AAB form with musical rhymes at the cadences.

One of Jordan's cansos is said to refer to the Holy Land by Linda Paterson, though neither she nor Kurt Lewent classifies it as a "crusading song". The poem actually refers to Edessa as representing the far reaches of the earth. The same song celebrates Guiborc de Montausier, the "viscountess" of Chalais (Chales or Chaletz):

.

References

Aubrey, Elizabeth. The Music of the Troubadours. Indiana University Press, 1996. . 
Kastner, L. E. "Notes on the Poems of Bertran de Born." The Modern Language Review, Vol. 27, No. 4. (Oct., 1932), pp. 398–419. 
Paterson, Linda M. "Occitan Literature and the Holy Land." The World of Eleanor of Aquitaine: Literature and Society in Southern France between the Eleventh and Twelfth Centuries, edd. Marcus Bull and Catherine Léglu. Woodbridge: Boydell Press, 2005. .

Notes

12th-century French troubadours
People from Poitou-Charentes